Lynn G. Berbano Finnegan (born October 3, 1970), was a Republican member of the Hawaii House of Representatives, representing the state's 32nd district from 2003 to 2011. The district includes the Lower Pearlridge, Aiea, Halawa, Hickam, Pearl Harbor and Moanalua Gardens  on the island of Oahu.

In 2005, Finnegan was selected to be the Minority Leader for the Republican members of the State House. She was re-selected as such in 2007 and 2009.

In 2008, the Aspen Institute's Rodel Fellowships in Public Leadership selected Representative Lynn Finnegan as one of 24 elected public officials as its 2008 class of Fellows. Each member of the class was selected on their reputation for intellect, thoughtfulness, and bipartisan approach to governing. The class is evenly divided between Republicans and Democrats and represents Fellows from 22 states, serving at both local and state levels of government.

In 2009, Finnegan voted against HB 444, a Hawaii civil union bill. She said, "If we push to have government certify or make legal a union or marriage between the same sex, I believe that we push what is accepted to what will be promoted."

In 2009, Finnegan was selected as one of the 100 Most Influential Filipina Women in the U.S. An award by the Filipina Women's Network. Representative Finnegan was awarded in the Policymakers & Visionaries category which recognize Filipina women leaders who have made or are making a difference in government policies or laws that impact business, industry, and society and who enrich the lives and careers of others by sharing the benefits of their wealth, experience, and knowledge.

Finnegan declined to run for re-election in 2010, instead running for Lieutenant Governor of Hawaii in the 2010 election. She won the Republican primary and joined gubernatorial candidate Duke Aiona in the general election as his running mate. The Republican ticket was defeated by Democratic nominees Neil Abercrombie and Brian Schatz.

Recent career
Finnegan currently serves as Assistant Head of Schools at Hanalani Schools, her alma mater. She had previously worked at Waialae Elementary School, Voyager Charter School, and Hawaii Public Charter Schools.

External links
 Hawaii State Legislature - Representative Lynn Finnegan
 Project Vote Smart - Representative Lynn Berbano Finnegan

References 

1970 births
21st-century American women
American politicians of Filipino descent
American women of Filipino descent in politics
Asian-American people in Hawaii politics
Hawaii politicians of Filipino descent
Living people
Republican Party members of the Hawaii House of Representatives
Politicians from Honolulu
Women state legislators in Hawaii
Asian conservatism in the United States